Better Farming Train may refer to:

Better Farming Train (Saskatchewan) which toured Saskatchewan, Canada between 1914 and 1922
Better Farming Train (New South Wales) which toured New South Wales, Australia between 1927 and 1929
Better Farming Train (Victoria) which toured Victoria, Australia between 1924 and 1935